Nanum is a genus of bicosoecids, a small group of unicellular flagellates, included among the heterokonts.

References

External links 
 

Bikosea
Heterokont genera